The 2022 LTP Charleston Pro Tennis was a professional tennis tournament played on outdoor clay courts. It was the thirteenth edition of the tournament which was part of the 2022 ITF Women's World Tennis Tour. It took place in Charleston, South Carolina, United States between 25 April and 1 May 2022.

Singles main draw entrants

Seeds

 1 Rankings are as of 18 April 2022.

Other entrants
The following players received wildcards into the singles main draw:
  Hailey Baptiste
  Sophie Chang
  Taylor Townsend
  Marcela Zacarías

The following player received entry as a special exempt:
  Louisa Chirico

The following players received entry from the qualifying draw:
  Françoise Abanda
  Gabriela Cé
  Alexa Graham
  Elizabeth Halbauer
  Catherine Harrison
  Whitney Osuigwe
  Akvilė Paražinskaitė
  Chanelle Van Nguyen

Champions

Singles

  Taylor Townsend def.  Wang Xiyu, 6–3, 6–2

Doubles

  Katarzyna Kawa /  Aldila Sutjiadi def.  Sophie Chang /  Angela Kulikov, 6–1, 6–4

References

External links
 2022 LTP Charleston Pro Tennis at ITFtennis.com
 Official website

2022 ITF Women's World Tennis Tour
2022 in American tennis
April 2022 sports events in the United States
May 2022 sports events in the United States